Le Tiroir secret is a 1986 French family drama TV mini-series (6 episodes) directed by Michel Boisrond, Edouard Molinaro, Nadine Trintignant and Roger Gillioz. The screenplay was written by Danièle Thompson, Jean-Patrick Manchette, Patrick Besson and Roger Grenier. The music score is by Vladimir Cosma.
It was released on DVD in France on 18 October 2006. 
It tells the story of a woman who suspects that her husband (presumed dead) had in fact led a double life.

Cast
 Michèle Morgan as  Colette Dutilleul / Colette Lemarchand 
 Marie-France Pisier as  Nathalie Duthilleul
 Daniel Gélin as  Jean-Pierre 
 Michael Lonsdale as  Philippe 
 Heinz Bennent   
 Liselotte Pulver   
 Jeanne Moreau as  Vivi 
 Mike Marshall as  Luc 
 Tonie Marshall as  Juliette 
 Paulette Dubost

External links

Le Tiroir secret at CineEmotions
Le Tiroir secret at Amazon.fr

French television films
Films scored by Vladimir Cosma